Jacob Robert Woodford (born October 28, 1996) is an American professional baseball pitcher for the St. Louis Cardinals of Major League Baseball (MLB). He made his MLB debut in 2020.

Amateur career
Woodford graduated from Plant High School in Tampa, Florida, where he played baseball and was teammates with Kyle Tucker. As a senior at Plant, Woodford was 7–0 with a 0.67 ERA. He committed to the University of Florida to play college baseball. He was drafted by the St. Louis Cardinals with the 39th overall pick in the 2015 Major League Baseball draft and signed, forgoing his commitment to Florida.

Professional career
Woodford made his professional debut with the Gulf Coast Cardinals and spent all of 2015 there, pitching to a 1–0 record and a 2.39 ERA in eight games. He spent the 2016 season with the Peoria Chiefs where was named a Midwest League All-Star and posted a 5–5 record with a 3.31 ERA and 82 strikeouts in 21 starts, and 2017 with the Palm Beach Cardinals, where he went 7–6 with a 3.10 ERA in 23 games (21 starts). Woodford was a non-roster invitee to 2018 spring training.

Woodford began the 2018 season with the Springfield Cardinals, with whom he was named a Texas League All-Star, and was promoted to the Memphis Redbirds during the season. In 16 starts for Springfield he compiled a 3–8 record with a 5.22 ERA, and in 12 starts for Memphis he was 5–5 with a 4.50 ERA. He returned to Memphis to begin 2019, earning Pacific Coast League All-Star honors. Over 26 starts for Memphis, Woodford went 9–8 with a 4.15 ERA, striking out 131 batters over  innings. Woodford was added to St. Louis' 40–man roster following the 2019 season.

On July 28, 2020, Woodford was promoted to the major leagues. On August 15, he made his major league debut against the Chicago White Sox, pitching three innings, giving up one earned run and striking out three. For the 2020 season, Woodford went 1-0 with a 5.57 ERA and 16 strikeouts over 21 innings.

In 2021, Woodford worked mainly as a reliever but also started 8 games in the second half. He went 3-4 with a 3.99 ERA and 50 strikeouts over  innings.

Woodford spent 2022 being recalled and optioned multiple times from the Memphis Redbirds, appearing in 11 games with the Redbirds (10 starts) and 27 games (1 start) with the Cardinals, where he went 4-0 with a 2.23 ERA across  innings.

He was reassigned to the minor leagues on October 9, 2022, and activated by the Cardinals again on January 17, 2023.

References

External links

1996 births
Living people
Baseball players from St. Petersburg, Florida
Major League Baseball pitchers
St. Louis Cardinals players
Gulf Coast Cardinals players
Peoria Chiefs players
Palm Beach Cardinals players
Springfield Cardinals players
Memphis Redbirds players
Henry B. Plant High School alumni